R Horologii is a red giant star approximately 1,000 light-years away in the southern constellation of Horologium. It is a Mira variable with a period of 404.83 days, ranging from apparent magnitude 4.7 to 14.3—one of the largest ranges in brightness known of stars in the night sky visible to the unaided eye.

References

External links 
 Light Curve of R Hor (R Horologii) from VSNET reports

M-type giants
Mira variables
Horologium (constellation)
018242
Horologii, R
0868
013502
Durchmusterung objects